Adekunle Almoruf Kosoko (born 28 January 1987), known professionally as Adekunle Gold and AG Baby, is a Nigerian Afrobeats singer and songwriter currently signed to Def Jam Recordings. He gained widespread attention after releasing the 2015 hit single "Sade", a highlife cover of One Direction's "Story of My Life". He signed a record deal with YBNL Nation and released his 2015 debut studio album Gold, which debuted at number 7 on the Billboard World Albums chart. Gold was preceded by the release of three singles: "Sade", "Orente" and "Pick Up". Adekunle Gold revealed to Nigerian Entertainment Today that prior to signing with YBNL, he designed the label's official logo and completed other designs for Lil Kesh, Viktoh and Olamide.

Education 
He holds a Higher National Diploma in Arts and Design from Lagos State Polytechnic.

Career

2010–2014: Career beginnings 
While growing up, Adekunle developed interest in music while listening to songs by King Sunny Ade and Ebenezer Obey. He became a member of his church's junior choir during his teenage years, and went on to write his first song at the age of 15. In 2014, Adekunle went solo after disbanding from a music group he formed with a friend while in school. He was dubbed the "King of Photoshop" after posting an edited photoshop image of him hugging Tiwa Savage on social media platforms. On 19 December 2014, he released "Sade", a cover of One Direction's "Story of My Life". The song rose to critical acclaim and was nominated for Best Alternative Song at The Headies 2015.

2015–present: Gold

After the release of "Sade", Adekunle released his first official single titled "Orente" through YBNL Nation after signing a music contract with the record label on 5 March 2015. He was nominated in the Most Promising Act of the Year category at the 2015 City People Entertainment Awards. On 18 July 2016, Adekunle Gold revealed the cover and track list of his debut studio album titled Gold. The album is a 16-track project, with musical production from Pheelz, Masterkraft, B Banks, Sleekamo, Oscar and Seyikeyz. It was released on 25 July, three days before the original scheduled date of release. Upon its release, it peaked at #7 on the Billboard World Album Chart for the week of 13 August 2016. Moreover, it was critically reviewed by contemporary music critics. Following his departure from YBNL Nation due to the expiry of his contract, Adekunle Gold unveiled his band "The 79th Element" in reference to the atomic number of gold. On 15 January 2018, Unity Bank unveiled Adekunle Gold as their brand ambassador. Adekunle Gold Releases His Highly Anticipated Album 'Afro Pop Vol. 1'on 21 August 2020. 

On 4 February 2022, Adekunle Gold unleashed his long-awaited fourth studio album titled "Catch Me If You Can" containing 14 tracks, with guest appearances from Davido, Fatoumata Diawara, Lucky Daye, Stefflon Don, Foushee, and TY Dolla $ign. 

Furthermore, "Catch Me If You Can" album is nothing less than the best and music production credits includes: Seyifunmi, Davayo, Rymez, Lekka, TMXO, Tay Iwar, Blaise Beatz, Kali, Que Beats, and Spax.

On March 2023, Adekunle Gold was signed to Def Jam Recordings. In a statement with Billboard, the CEO of Def Jam Recordings, Tunji Balogun announced that Adekunle Gold signed to Def Jam.

Personal life
Adekunle married Simi in January 2019. They had been dating for five years. They had a daughter in May 2020.

The singer was linked to accusations of infidelity with a popular video vixen, Teminikan. This was first mentioned on 21 March 2021 by a blogger known as GistLover, who posted the photo of the video vixen on the blog's Instagram page warning her to stay away from him. Screenshots also posted on the blogger's Instagram page on the same day both confirmed the blogger's accusation and implied that his wife Simi was aware of her husband's infidelities.

On 15 July 2022, Gold announced his battle with sickle-cell diseases since childhood that inspired his newly released song titled "5 Star".

Discography

Albums
 Gold (2016)
 About 30 (2018)
 Afro Pop Vol. 1 (2020)
 Catch Me If You Can (2022)

Selected singles
 "Sade" (2014)
 "Temptation" (2014)
 "Orente" (2015)
 "Pick Up" (2015)
 "No Forget" feat Simi (2016)
 "Ariwo Ko" (2016)
 "Friend Zone" (2016)
 "Nurse Alabere" (2016)
 "Ready" (2016)
 "My Life" (2016)
 "Nurse Alabere" (2016) 
 "Friend Zone"  (2016) 
 "Work" (2016)
 "Beautiful Night" (2016)
 "Fight For You" (2016)
 "Sweet Me" (2016)
 "Paradise" (2016)
 "Call on me" (2017)
 "Only Girl" feat Moelogo (2017)
 "Money" (2017)
 "Ire" (2018)
 "Damn Delilah" (2018)
 "Before You Wake Up" (2019)
 "Young love" (2019)
 "Kelegbe Megbe"
"Jore" feat Kizz Daniel (2020)
"Something Different" (2020)
"AG Baby" feat Nailah Blackman (2020)
"It Is What It Is" (2021)
"Sinner" (2021)
"High" feat Davido (2021)
"Mercy" (2022)
"5 Star" (2022)
"Party No Dey Stop" feat Zinoleesky (2023)

Awards and nominations

See also

 List of Nigerian musicians
 YBNL Nation
 Simi
 olamide

References

External links
 

Living people
Musicians from Lagos State
Nigerian male singer-songwriters
People from Lagos State
YBNL Nation artists
Lagos State Polytechnic alumni
21st-century Nigerian  male singers
Yoruba royalty
Yoruba-language singers
The Headies winners
1987 births